Circe is a 1964 Argentine film directed by Manuel Antín. It was entered into the 14th Berlin International Film Festival.

The film is based on a short story by Julio Cortázar, published in 1951. Its main theme is about perverse sexual gratification in a repressed Catholic environment. Delia Mañara is notorious in her quarter of Buenos Aires for the mysterious deaths of two of her fiancés. She lives in a twilight world and gains most satisfaction through the exercise of power over others. It emerges that she killed the two men by poisoning them with the sweets she makes; when this fails with her third fiancé, he is freed from her fatal attraction by the knowledge.

Cast

References

External links 
 

1964 films
1960s Spanish-language films
Argentine black-and-white films
Films directed by Manuel Antín
Films based on works by Julio Cortázar
Films based on short fiction
1960s Argentine films